Renal replacement therapy (RRT) is therapy that replaces the normal blood-filtering function of the kidneys. It is used when the kidneys are not working well, which is called  kidney failure and includes acute kidney injury and chronic kidney disease. Renal replacement therapy includes dialysis (hemodialysis or peritoneal dialysis), hemofiltration, and hemodiafiltration, which are various ways of filtration of blood with or without machines. Renal replacement therapy also includes kidney transplantation, which is the ultimate form of replacement in that the old kidney is replaced by a donor kidney.

These treatments are not truly cures for kidney disease. In the context of chronic kidney disease, they are more accurately viewed as life-extending treatments, although if chronic kidney disease is managed well with dialysis and a compatible graft is found early and is successfully transplanted, the clinical course can be quite favorable, with life expectancy of many years. Likewise, in certain acute illnesses or trauma resulting in acute kidney injury, a person could very well survive for many years, with relatively good kidney function, before needing intervention again, as long as they had good response to dialysis, they got a kidney transplant fairly quickly if needed, their body did not reject the transplanted kidney, and they had no other significant health problems. Early dialysis (and, if indicated, early renal transplant) in acute kidney failure usually brings more favorable outcomes.

Types
Hemodialysis, hemofiltration, and hemodiafiltration can be continuous or intermittent and can use an arteriovenous route (in which blood leaves from an artery and returns via a vein) or a venovenous route (in which blood leaves from a vein and returns via a vein). This results in various types of RRT, as follows:
 continuous renal replacement therapy (CRRT) — continuous renal replacement therapy (CRRT) is a form of dialysis therapy used in critical care settings. The benefit of CRRT for critically ill patients is that it runs slowly (generally over 24 hours to several days) allowing for removal of excess fluid and uremic toxins with less risk of hypotensive complications.
 continuous hemodialysis (CHD)
 continuous arteriovenous hemodialysis (CAVHD)
 continuous venovenous hemodialysis (CVVHD)
 continuous hemofiltration (CHF)
 continuous arteriovenous hemofiltration (CAVH or CAVHF)
 continuous venovenous hemofiltration (CVVH or CVVHF)
 continuous hemodiafiltration (CHDF)
 continuous arteriovenous hemodiafiltration (CAVHDF)
 continuous venovenous hemodiafiltration (CVVHDF)
 intermittent renal replacement therapy (IRRT)
 intermittent hemodialysis (IHD)
 intermittent venovenous hemodialysis (IVVHD)
 intermittent hemofiltration (IHF)
 intermittent venovenous hemofiltration (IVVH or IVVHF)
 intermittent hemodiafiltration (IHDF)
 intermittent venovenous hemodiafiltration (IVVHDF)

See also 
 Artificial kidney

References

External links
 

Nephrology procedures